A circle jerk is a sexual practice involving group masturbation, especially when all-male.

Circle jerk may also refer to:
 a slang term for an echo chamber
 Circle Jerks, an American punk band
 "Circle Jerk", a song by Aerosmith from Pandora's Box